The 2003 New Jersey State Senate elections were held on November 4.

The election took midway through Jim McGreevey's term as Governor of New Jersey. The election ended two years of split control in favor of the Democratic Party, which regained a majority for the first time since 1991. Incumbent Senate co-President John O. Bennett was unseated for re-election by Ellen Karcher.

Incumbents not running for re-election

Democratic 
 Joseph Suliga (District 22) (withdrew to enter rehabilitation for alcoholism)

Republican 
 James Cafiero (District 1)

Additionally, Senators John J. Matheussen, Richard Bagger, and Garry Furnari, who were elected in 2001, resigned before their terms were completed. The interim appointees for each of their seats ran as incumbents.

Summary of results by State Senate district

District 1

District 2

District 3

District 4

District 5

District 6

District 7

District 8

District 9

District 10

District 11

District 12

District 13

District 14

District 15

District 16

District 17

District 18

District 19

District 20

District 21

District 22

District 23

District 24

District 25

District 26

District 27

District 28

District 29

District 30

District 31

District 32

District 33

District 34

District 35

District 36

District 37

District 38

District 39

District 40

References 

New Jersey State Senate elections
New Jersey State Senate
2003 New Jersey elections